C. milleri may refer to:
 Calliphora milleri, a synonym for Calliphora hilli, a blow fly species
 Candida milleri, a yeast species now known as Candida humilis
 Cochliopina milleri, the Miller's snail, a freshwater snail species endemic to Mexico
 Coleotechnites milleri, the lodgepole needleminer, a moth species found in the United States and Canada